Torleiv Schibsted Corneliussen (July 25, 1890 – April 29, 1975) was a Norwegian sailor who competed in the 1912 Summer Olympics. He was a crew member of the Norwegian boat Taifun, which won the gold medal in the 8 metre class.

References

External links
profile

1890 births
1975 deaths
Norwegian male sailors (sport)
Sailors at the 1912 Summer Olympics – 8 Metre
Olympic sailors of Norway
Olympic gold medalists for Norway
Olympic medalists in sailing
Medalists at the 1912 Summer Olympics